Vinjamuri Seetha Devi (died 17 May 2016) was a musician, singer, and scholar of Telugu folk music.

Life
Devi was a producer of folk music on All India Radio.

Along with her sister Vinjamuri Anasuya Devi they composed music for many of Andhra Pradesh's notable poets. These include Srirangam Srinivisa Rao (Sri Sri).

She contributed music for the 1979 film Maa Bhoomi. She wrote "Folk Music of Andhra Pradesh". She died on 17 May 2016 in the United States of America.

References

Year of birth missing
2016 deaths
Indian women classical musicians
Indian women musicologists
Indian musicologists
People from Kakinada
Singers from Andhra Pradesh
Indian women folk singers
Indian folk singers
20th-century Indian singers
Indian folk musicians
20th-century Indian educators
20th-century Indian women singers
Educators from Andhra Pradesh
Women musicians from Andhra Pradesh
21st-century Indian women singers
21st-century Indian singers
Scholars from Andhra Pradesh
Women educators from Andhra Pradesh
20th-century women educators